The Grenada 17 were the seventeen political, military and civilian figures convicted of various crimes associated with the 1983 overthrow of Maurice Bishop's government of Grenada and his subsequent murder.

History

In October 1983, various officials of the People's Revolutionary Government (PRG) of Grenada, under the leadership of Deputy Prime Minister Bernard Coard, deposed and placed under house arrest Prime Minister Maurice Bishop. Large public demonstrations followed across the country. On 19 October 1983, a large demonstration at the Prime Minister's residence led to Bishop being freed. Bishop then went with a large group to army headquarters at Fort Rupert. Later in the day, an army unit arrived from Fort Frederick and a large number of civilians at the fort subsequently died.  

After the fighting, eight people were lined up against a courtyard wall at the fort for a considerable amount of time, before being shot by firing squad. The eight executed people consisted of:

Prime Minister Maurice Bishop
Foreign Minister Unison Whiteman
Minister of Housing Norris Bain
President of the Agricultural and General Workers Union Fitzroy Bain
Minister of Education Jacqueline Creft
Keith Hayling of the Marketing & National Import Board
Evelyn Bullen, businessman
Cecil Evelyn Maitland, businessman

After the subsequent US invasion and overthrow of the Coard Government, eighteen people were put on trial for their responsibility in the death of Maurice Bishop. On 4 December 1986, the High Court of Grenada returned death sentences against 14 individuals in the deaths of Bishop and the seven others:

Hudson Austin (Head of the Army)
Bernard Coard (Deputy Prime Minister/Acting Prime Minister)
Dave Bartholomew(Grenadian politician) (Central Committee member)
Callistus Bernard (private in charge of the firing squad at Fort Rupert - admitted shooting Bishop)
Phyllis Coard (Deputy Minister for Foreign Affairs)
Leon Cornwall (Central Committee member)
Liam James(Grenadian politician) (Central Committee member)
Ewart Layne (General - dispatched army forces to Fort Rupert)
Colville McBarnette (Central Committee member)
Cecil Prime (Captain - present at Fort Rupert at the time of the executions)
Lester Redhead (Captain - present at Fort Rupert at the time of the executions)
Selwyn "Sello" Strachan (Central Committee member)
Christopher Stroude (Major - present at Fort Rupert at the time of the executions)
John Ventour (Captain)

Two defendants were found guilty of eight incidents of manslaughter and given 45-year prison sentences.

Raymond Vincent Joseph
Cosmos Richardson

Andy Michell was found guilty of manslaughter and given 30 years in prison.

Raeburn Nelson was found not guilty and released.

All fourteen death sentences were subsequently commuted to prison terms.

On 18 December 2008, Hudson Austin, Colville McBarnett and John Ventour were released. The remaining prisoners were due to be released by 2010, and on Friday, 4 September 2009, the final seven held in connection with the Bishop coup were released from prison. Senator Chester Humphrey described the release as a milestone in the island's effort to heal wounds from the events of 1983. "It's the end of one chapter, not the completion of the book, as Grenada tries to build a future by not living in the past," he said, according to Associated Press news agency reports on 26 January 2009.

Claims of the accused

The seventeen have always maintained that they could not be held responsible for the murders of Maurice Bishop and the seven others. The accused who were in positions of authority in government and the army claim to have given no orders for the execution of the men and women. Callistus Bernard, the private who admits to organizing the firing squad and having shot Bishop, states that he "lost it". Several senior army officers present at the fort claim to have been elsewhere in the fort at the time of the executions. 

Colville McBarnette, while having admitted his role in a central committee meeting he claims ordered the execution of Bishop, says that he is innocent because of the minor degree of responsibility he had in the decision.

Ewart Layne signed a confession at the time of Bishop's murder accepting sole responsibility for issuing the orders that led to the executions. Layne subsequently said that he was beaten and forced to sign the statement.

Hudson Austin had never explained his actions nor attempted to defend them.

Bernard Coard, the head of government at the time, had stated that he intended to leave the country after the protests concerning his arrest of Bishop broke out.

Criticism

Some have questioned the fairness of the defendants' trial. Several people have campaigned on their behalf worldwide, and a pamphlet by Richard Hart, The Grenada Trial: A Travesty of Justice (Committee for Human Rights in Grenada, 1993), gives a critique of the trial process. In October 2003, Amnesty International issued a report stating that their arrest and trial had been a miscarriage of justice.

References

External links

 Official website 

History of Grenada
Quantified groups of defendants
20th century in Grenada